Finland competed at the 1984 Summer Paralympics in Stoke Mandeville, Great Britain and New York City, United States. 57 competitors from Finland won 59 medals including 18 gold, 14 silver and 27 bronze and finished 15th in the medal table.

See also 
 Finland at the Paralympics
 Finland at the 1984 Summer Olympics

References 

1984
1984 in Finnish sport
Nations at the 1984 Summer Paralympics